Peter Richard Coneway (April 13, 1944 Harlingen, Texas – November 13, 2020 Houston, Texas) was an investment banker, a member of the Board of Regents of The University of Texas System for a six-year term, and the American Ambassador to Switzerland and Liechtenstein from 2006 until 2008.

Biography
He grew up in Harlingen, Texas, the son of Albert Earl Coneway, the city attorney and Clara Laroux "Sue" Durham Coneway. Coneway was a running back for the Harlingen High School Cardinals football team.  He earned a BBA in 1966 from the McCombs School of Business at the University of Texas at Austin and in 1969, an MBA from the Stanford Graduate School of Business.

Career
Coneway served in several leadership positions for Goldman Sachs for whom he worked from 1969 until he retired as general partner in November 1992.  Those positions included resident manager of the Houston office, becoming resident partner in 1978. In 1987 and 1988, he was managing director of the company's Tokyo office.

Appointed by Ann Richards to be a University of Texas Regent in February 1993, he resigned on August 12, 1993, because he continued to have “a limited business relationship” with Goldman Sachs and he wanted “to avoid any appearance of conflict of interest.”

In 2009, Riverstone Holdings LLC named him managing director.

References

External links
Cables show US concern at Swiss-Iran plan

Ambassadors of the United States to Switzerland
Ambassadors of the United States to Liechtenstein
McCombs School of Business alumni
Stanford Graduate School of Business alumni
People from Harlingen, Texas
American investment bankers
1944 births
2020 deaths
University of Texas System regents
Goldman Sachs people